The Pursuit of Happiness may refer to "Life, Liberty and the pursuit of Happiness", a phrase in the United States Declaration of Independence, as well as:

Films 
The Pursuit of Happiness (1934 film), starring Joan Bennett
The Pursuit of Happiness (1971 film), directed by Robert Mulligan, based on Thomas Rogers' novel of the same name
The Pursuit of Happiness (1988 film), an Australian film directed by Martha Ansara
Pursuit of Happiness, a 2001 film starring Frank Whaley, Annabeth Gish, and Amy Jo Johnson
The Pursuit of Happyness, 2006 film based on a true story about Chris Gardner, a father that battled homelessness while training to be a stockbroker.

Music 
The Pursuit of Happiness (band), a Canadian power-pop band
Pursuit of Happiness (Arthur Loves Plastic album)
Pursuit of Happiness (Weekend Players album)
The Pursuit of Happiness (Beat Farmers album), 1987
"Pursuit of Happiness" (song), by Kid Cudi
"The Pursuit of Happiness" by Band of Susans from Love Agenda

Books 
The Pursuit of Happiness: A Book of Studies and Storwings, an 1893 non-fiction book by Daniel Garrison Brinton
The Pursuit of Happiness, a 1968 novel by Thomas Rogers
The Pursuit of Happiness, a 2001 novel by Douglas Kennedy

Television 
The Pursuit of Happiness (1987 TV series), a 1987–1988 TV series starring Paul Provenza
The Pursuit of Happiness (1995 TV series), an American sitcom

See also
The Pursuit of Happyness, a 2006 film starring Will Smith
 "Life, Liberty and the pursuit of Happiness", a phrase in the United States Declaration of Independence